Kumedpur Junction railway station is a railway Junction station on the Howrah–New Jalpaiguri line of Katihar railway division of Northeast Frontier Railway zone. This station connects  with Howrah–New Jalpaiguri railway route. It is situated at Telgram, Kumedpur of Malda district in the Indian state of West Bengal. Total 33 trains including a number of express trains stop at Kumedpur Junction railway station.

References

Railway stations in Malda district
Katihar railway division
Railway junction stations in West Bengal